Subhasish Chakraborty is an Indian politician, currently serving in the Rajya Sabha.

References

Rajya Sabha members from West Bengal